Alan Wareing (born 16 August 1943 in Chorley, Lancashire) is a British television director. He became interested in directing through amateur theatre. He directed many plays before he started working in BBC Television, firstly as an assistant floor manager and then as a production assistant, before training to be a director at the corporation. His early work as a director included three Doctor Who serials from Sylvester McCoy's era as the Seventh Doctor, and he has directed hundreds of episodes of the ITV soap operas Coronation Street and Emmerdale.

Filmography

Director
London's Burning - 1988
Doctor Who
The Greatest Show in the Galaxy - 1988 
Ghost Light - 1989    
Survival - 1989
Notaufnahme - 1995
Wycliffe
Strangers - 1997  
Bad Blood - 1997  
Time Out - 1998  
Feeding the Rat - 1998  
Scope - 1998  
Land's End - 1998
Casualty
Cry for Help - 1987  
Cross Fingers - 1987  
Fun Night - 1987  
These Things Happen - 1987  
Close to Home - 1990  
Say It with Flowers - 1990  
All's Fair - 1990  
Beggars Can't Be Choosers - 1991  
Sins of Omission - 1991  
Allegiance - 1991 
Rates of Exchange - 1992  
Cherish - 1992  
Tender Loving Care - 1992  
Divided Loyalties - 1993  
No Cause for Alarm - 1993  
Moving On - 1997 
An Eye for an Eye - 1998  
One from the Heart - 1998  
Making a Difference - 1998  
Seeing the Light - 1999  
Just a Kiss - 1999  
Untouchable - 2000  
Chinese Whispers - 2000  
The Long Road Home - 2001
Coronation Street 
Episode #1.5328 - 2002  
Episode #1.6074 - 2005  
Episode #1.6073 - 2005  
Episode #1.6076 - 2005  
Episode #1.6468 - 2007  
Episode #1.6467 - 2007
Emmerdale Farm  
Episode dated 25 May 1993  
Episode dated 27 May 1993 
Episode dated 6 June 2000  
Episode dated 19 July 2001 
Episode dated 20 February 2003 
Episode dated 21 February 2003  
Episode dated 6 October 2003  
Episode dated 7 October 2003  
Episode dated 8 October 2003  
Episode dated 9 October 2003 
Episode dated 10 October 2003 
Episode dated 12 October 2003  
Episode dated 18 November 2003  
Episode dated 19 November 2003 
Episode dated 20 November 2003  
Episode dated 21 November 2003  
Episode dated 24 November 2003  
Episode dated 4 January 2004 
Episode dated 5 January 2004  
Episode dated 6 January 2004  
Episode dated 7 January 2004
Episode dated 8 January 2004 
Episode dated 9 January 2004 
Episode dated 30 January 2006 
Episode dated 31 January 2006  
Episode dated 1 February 2006  
Episode dated 2 February 2006  
Episode dated 21 March 2006 
Episode dated 22 March 2006  
Episode dated 26 March 2006  
Episode dated 15 April 2007  
Episode dated 16 April 2007
Holby City - 2013

Production Manager
Tenko - 1981
The Dark Side of the Sun - 1983
A Murder is Announced - 1985
Lovejoy
The Real Thing - 1986
The Axeman Cometh - 1986

Other
Survivors (assistant floor manager) - 1975
Doctor Who
The Keeper of Traken: Part one (production assistant) - 1981
Super Sleuths
Wycliffe (Himself) - 2006

References

External links

1943 births
British television directors
Living people
People from Chorley